ABBA Voyage is a virtual concert residency by the Swedish pop group ABBA. The concerts feature virtual avatars (dubbed 'ABBAtars'), depicting the group as they appeared in 1977. The concerts are held in a purpose-built venue at the Queen Elizabeth Olympic Park in London, officially called the ABBA Arena.

The digital versions of ABBA have been created with motion capture and performance techniques with the four band members and the visual effects company Industrial Light & Magic, in what is the company’s first foray into music.

The ABBA Voyage concert is produced by Svana Gisla and Ludvig Andersson, director Baillie Walsh, co-executive producer Johan Renck and choreographer Wayne McGregor.

Pophouse, a Swedish entertainment company, is a co-developer of the project and its lead investor. Two Pophouse executives, Michael Bolingbroke and Per Sundin, both serve in leadership positions of the production company behind the show. According to multiple media reports, the project is one of the most expensive live music experiences in history, with a budget of $175 million. The show was nominated for two categories at the 21st Visual Effects Society Awards, losing Outstanding Virtual Cinematography in a CG Project to the science-fiction film Avatar: The Way of Water, but winning Outstanding Visual Effects in a Special Venue Project.

Background
ABBA had unofficially split up in December 1982, and despite renewed interest in the band from the 1990s onwards, following the worldwide success of their greatest hits album ABBA Gold, the musical Mamma Mia! and its film adaptation, the members had repeatedly refused to re-form. Reportedly, they turned down an offer of $1 billion in 2000 to perform again. In 2008, Björn Ulvaeus told The Sunday Telegraph, "We will never appear on stage again. There is simply no motivation to re-group." He repeated the statement in an interview in 2014 while promoting the publication of ABBA: The Official Photo Book.

In September 2017, Benny Andersson told Swedish newspaper Expressen that there were plans for ABBA to tour "virtually", using digital avatars of the group. Ulvaeus told the BBC that the idea had been proposed to the band by Simon Fuller. The idea of using representations of a singer backed by a live band originated with Elvis: The Concert in the 1990s, when Elvis Presley "sang" at concerts via old video clips accompanied by his live backup band. In April 2018, the four members issued a statement saying that during preparations for the tour, they had regrouped in the studio and had recorded two new songs, titled "I Still Have Faith in You" and "Don't Shut Me Down".

On 26 August 2021, the "ABBA Voyage" website was launched, indicating the announcement of a new project a week later. On 2 September 2021, a globally-streamed press conference from the Queen Elizabeth Olympic Park in east London confirmed that the virtual concerts would take place in London from 27 May 2022. In addition, it was announced that a new ABBA album, Voyage, would be released on 5 November. The new album would feature ten songs including the previously-announced "I Still Have Faith in You" and "Don't Shut Me Down". The concerts feature a 10-piece live band playing alongside the group's avatars, performing 22 of ABBA's songs. The live band was selected by James Righton of Klaxons and features Little Boots on keys.

Concerts started in May 2022, and are currently extended until January 2024, with the possibility to extend the shows up until April 2026, when the permission for the ABBA Arena expires to give space to a housing project on the site.

ABBAtar technology
The ABBA band members wore motion-capture suits as part of the development process and were filmed as they performed a 22-song set over the course of five weeks. Some 160 cameras were used, with graphics later added by Industrial Light & Magic. The choreography is based on the band members' real movements, but captured from younger body doubles. The digital band, utilising the songs' originally-recorded vocals, are accompanied by a live instrumental band on stage.

Reception

Opening night
The opening night of ABBA Voyage was attended by celebrities, including Kylie Minogue, Keira Knightley, Kate Moss, Sharleen Spiteri, and Carola Häggkvist, as well as members of the Swedish royal family including Carl XVI Gustaf and Queen Silvia. Mark Sutherland of Variety wrote that the crowd gave a standing ovation at the concert. After the 90-minute avatar performance, the four members of ABBA appeared on stage and gave a curtain call. The first showing was met with positive acclaim.

Setlist
The following set list was obtained from the concert held on 26 May 2022 at the ABBA Arena in London, the opening show. It does not represent all concerts for the duration of the residency.

Act 1
"Skallgång" (introduction)
"The Visitors"
"Hole in Your Soul"
"SOS" (with "EastEnders theme tune" piano introduction)
"Knowing Me, Knowing You" (video interlude) 
Act 2
 "Chiquitita"
"Fernando"
"Mamma Mia"
"Does Your Mother Know"
"Eagle" ("Rora" video interlude 1)
Act 3
 "Lay All Your Love on Me" (video interlude) 
"Summer Night City"
"Gimme! Gimme! Gimme! (A Man After Midnight)"
"Voulez-Vous" ("Rora" video interlude 2)
Act 4
 "When All Is Said and Done"
"Don't Shut Me Down"
"I Still Have Faith in You"
"Waterloo" (video interlude) 
Act 5
 "Thank You for the Music" 
"Dancing Queen" 
Encore
 "The Winner Takes It All"
 "I Wonder (Departure)" (instrumental outro)

Personnel
Personnel adapted from NME, Vogue and Industrial Light & Magic.  

ABBA:
 Agnetha Fältskog
 Björn Ulvaeus
 Benny Andersson
 Anni-Frid Lyngstad
Band:
 James Righton – band casting
 Sarah Burrell – keyboards, synthesizer
 Victoria Hesketh – keyboards, synthesizer
 Dom John – guitar
 Anna Kirby – sax
 Tuca Milan – percussion
 Eoin Rooney – guitar
 Victoria Smith – drums
 Joe Stoddart – bass
 Rachel Clark – backing vocals
 Grace Barrett – backing vocals
 Anima Gichinga – backing vocals
Crew:
 Svana Gisla – producer
 Ludvig Andersson – producer  
 Baillie Walsh – director
 Johan Renck – co-executive producer
 Wayne McGregor – movement director, choreographer
 Steve Aplin – motion director
 Ben Morris – visual effects supervisor
 Shynola – "Rora" video interludes
 Stufish Entertainment Architects – ABBA Arena
Body doubles:
 William Collins – Björn double
 Sonya Cullingford – Frida double
 Max Hessman – Benny double
 Isabel La Cras – Agnetha double
 Liv Austen – Agnetha understudy
 Heather Birley – Frida understudy
 Leo Elso – Benny understudy
 James Pattison – Björn understudy
Wardrobe:
 Bea Åkerlund – head costume designer
 Manish Arora – costume designer
 Roth House – costume designer
 Erevos Aether – costume designer
 Michael Schmidt – costume designer
 Dolce & Gabbana – costume designer
 Carolin Holzhuber – shoes designer
 Terry de Havilland – shoes designer

References

External links

 

ABBA
2022 concert residencies
2023 concert residencies